The Third Bullet is a novel by  Carter Dickson (pseudonym of John Dickson Carr), first edited in the United Kingdom in 1937.

This novel is a "whodunit" and a Locked-room mystery. The two regular detectives of the author, Gideon Fell and Henry Merrivale, don't appear in this novel.

Plot summary

Bibliography 
 John Dickson Carr, The Third Bullet, Hodder & Stoughton, 1937, 209 p. (British edition).
 John Dickson Carr, The Third and Other Stories, Harper & Row, New York, 1954, 209 p. (American edition).

References 

Novels by John Dickson Carr
1937 American novels
American horror novels
Locked-room mysteries